Yaroslav Deda (born 28 May 1999) is a professional Ukrainian football striker who played for Karpaty Halych.

Career
Deda is a product of the two different Sportive youth schools in Volyn Oblast. He made his debut in the Ukrainian Premier League for club FC Volyn Lutsk in a match against FC Stal Dniprodzerzhynsk as main-squad player on 13 March 2016.

He is also a member of the different Ukrainian youth representations.

His twin brother Myroslav is also a professional footballer.

References

External links 

Living people
1999 births
Association football forwards
Ukrainian footballers
Ukraine youth international footballers
Ukrainian Premier League players
FC Volyn Lutsk players
Qarabağ FK players
Ukrainian expatriate footballers
Expatriate footballers in Azerbaijan
Ukrainian expatriate sportspeople in Azerbaijan
Twin sportspeople
Ukrainian twins
FC Karpaty Lviv players
FC Karpaty Halych players
Ukrainian First League players
Ukrainian Second League players
Sportspeople from Lviv Oblast